Events from the year 1882 in France.

Incumbents
President: Jules Grévy 
President of the Council of Ministers: 
 until 30 January: Léon Gambetta 
 30 January-7 August: Charles de Freycinet
 starting 7 August: Charles Duclerc

Events
 28 March – Republican Jules Ferry makes primary education in France free, non-clerical (laique) and obligatory.
 6 May – North Sea Fisheries Convention is signed by United Kingdom, Germany, Denmark, Netherlands, Belgium and France to regulate the policy of the fisheries in the North Sea.

Births

January to March
 13 January – Darius Paul Dassault, General (died 1969)
 18 January – Lazare Lévy, pianist, composer and teacher (died 1964)
 19 January – Pierre Allemane, international soccer player (died 1956)
 5 February – Louis Wagner, motor racing driver (died 1960)
 21 February – Jean Dupas, painter, designer, poster artist and decorator (died 1964)
 26 February – Pierre Mac Orlan, novelist and songwriter (died 1970)
 20 March – René Coty, politician, President of France (died 1962)

April to June
 16 April – André Edouard Marty, artist (died 1974)
 17 April – Émile Muselier, Admiral (died 1965)
 10 May – Donatien Bouché, sailor and Olympic gold medallist (died 1965)
 13 May – Georges Braque, painter and sculptor (died 1963)
 25 May – Maurice Le Boucher, organist, composer, and pedagogue (died 1964)
 13 June – Claude-Léon Mascaux, sculptor (died 1965)
 22 June – Jacques Thubé, sailor and Olympic gold medallist (died 1969)
 28 June – Jean-Julien Lemordant, artist and soldier (died 1968)

July to September
 2 July – Princess Marie Bonaparte, psychoanalyst (died 1962)
 8 August – François Piétri, politician, Minister and diplomat (died 1966)
 10 August – Paul Marchandeau, politician and Minister (died 1968)
 16 August – Désiré Mérchez, swimmer, water polo player and Olympic medallist (died 1968)
 10 September – Jacques Gréber, architect (died 1962)
 24 September – Max Décugis, tennis player (died 1978)

October to December
 12 October – Émile Girardeau, engineer (died 1970).
 18 October – Lucien Petit-Breton, cyclist, winner of 1907 and 1908 Tour de France (died 1917)
 25 October – André-Damien-Ferdinand Jullien, Cardinal (died 1964)
 29 October – Jean Giraudoux, novelist, essayist, diplomat and playwright (died 1944)
 18 November – Jacques Maritain, Catholic philosopher (died 1973)
 22 November – Charles Vildrac, playwright and poet (died 1971)
 29 November – Henri Fabre, aviator and aircraft designer (died 1984)
 7 December – Robert Debré, pediatrician (died 1978)
 31 December – Eugène Le Moult, naturalist and entomologist (died 1967)

Full date unknown
 Louis Gernet, philologist and sociologist (died 1962)
 Robert Louzon, engineer, revolutionary syndicalist, anarchist and socialist (died 1976)
 Julien Peridier, electrical engineer and astronomer (died 1967)

Deaths

January to June
 1 February – Antoine Bussy, chemist (born 1794)
 12 February – Madame Céleste, actress (born 1815)
 20 February – Louis Adolphe le Doulcet, comte de Pontécoulant, soldier and musicologist (born 1794)
 8 April – Jules Etienne Joseph Quicherat, historian and archaeologist (born 1814)
 1 May – Célestine Guynemer de la Hailandière, Roman Catholic Archbishop of Indianapolis (born 1798)
 17 May – François Chabas, egyptologist (born 1817)
 15 June – Ernest Courtot de Cissey, General (born 1810)
 20 June – François-Auguste Biard, painter (born 1800)
 25 June – François Jouffroy, sculptor (born 1806)

July to December
 6 August – Antoine-Élisabeth-Cléophas Dareste de la Chavanne, historian (born 1820)
 16 August – Auguste-Alexandre Ducrot, general (born 1817)
 22 August – Louis-Auguste Desmarres, ophthalmologist (born 1810)
 8 September – Joseph Liouville, mathematician (born 1809)
 14 September – Georges Leclanché, electrical engineer (born 1839)
 6 December – Louis Blanc, politician and historian (born 1811)
 26 December – Henri Le Secq, painter and photographer (born 1818)
 31 December – Léon Gambetta, statesman (born 1838)

References

1880s in France